Beaumont Generating Station is a hydroelectric dam built on the Saint-Maurice River, in Zec de La Croche, in upper Mauricie, Quebec, Canada. This hydroelectric dam is located between La Trenche generating station and La Tuque generating station. It is the fifth dam from the head of the river, among 11. Unlike the other hydroelectric plants on the river, which took the name from the rapids or falls they drowned, the Central Beaumont was named for Robert J. Beaumont, the former president of the Shawinigan Water & Power Company.

Images

See also 
 Hydro-Québec
 Saint-Maurice River
 La Tuque
 Mauricie
 Zec de La Croche

References

External links 
 Central Beaumont 
 Dam Beaumont 

Dams in Quebec
Hydro-Québec
Dams completed in 1958
La Tuque, Quebec